Lopatino is the name of several  rural localities in Russia.

Arkhangelsk Oblast
As of 2010, one rural locality in Arkhangelsk Oblast bears this name:
Lopatino, Arkhangelsk Oblast, a village in Irtovsky Selsoviet of Lensky District

Ivanovo Oblast
As of 2010, two rural localities in Ivanovo Oblast bear this name:
Lopatino, Furmanovsky District, Ivanovo Oblast, a village in Furmanovsky District
Lopatino, Lezhnevsky District, Ivanovo Oblast, a village in Lezhnevsky District

Kaluga Oblast
As of 2010, four rural localities in Kaluga Oblast bear this name:
Lopatino, Dzerzhinsky District, Kaluga Oblast, a village in Dzerzhinsky District
Lopatino, Maloyaroslavetsky District, Kaluga Oblast, a village in Maloyaroslavetsky District
Lopatino, Tarussky District, Kaluga Oblast, a selo in Tarussky District
Lopatino, Zhukovsky District, Kaluga Oblast, a village in Zhukovsky District

Kirov Oblast
As of 2010, one rural locality in Kirov Oblast bears this name:
Lopatino, Kirov Oblast, a village in Prosnitsky Rural Okrug of Kirovo-Chepetsky District

Krasnoyarsk Krai
As of 2010, one rural locality in Krasnoyarsk Krai bears this name:
Lopatino, Krasnoyarsk Krai, a village in Voznesensky Selsoviet of Beryozovsky District

Lipetsk Oblast
As of 2010, one rural locality in Lipetsk Oblast bears this name:
Lopatino, Lipetsk Oblast, a railway station in Petrovsky Selsoviet of Izmalkovsky District

Republic of Mordovia
As of 2010, three rural localities in the Republic of Mordovia bear this name:
Lopatino (selo), Lyambirsky District, Republic of Mordovia, a selo in Salovsky Selsoviet of Lyambirsky District
Lopatino (village), Lyambirsky District, Republic of Mordovia, a village in Salovsky Selsoviet of Lyambirsky District
Lopatino, Torbeyevsky District, Republic of Mordovia, a selo in Lopatinsky Selsoviet of Torbeyevsky District

Federal city of Moscow
As of 2012, one rural locality in the federal city of Moscow bears this name:
Lopatino, Moscow, a village in Rogovskoye Settlement of Novomoskovsky Administrative Okrug

Moscow Oblast
As of 2012, two rural localities in Moscow Oblast bear this name:
Lopatino, Leninsky District, Moscow Oblast, a village in Bulatnikovskoye Rural Settlement of Leninsky District
Lopatino, Mozhaysky District, Moscow Oblast, a village in Yurlovskoye Rural Settlement of Mozhaysky District

Nizhny Novgorod Oblast
As of 2010, eight rural localities in Nizhny Novgorod Oblast bear this name:
Lopatino, Shakhunya, Nizhny Novgorod Oblast, a village in Khmelevitsky Selsoviet of the town of oblast significance of Shakhunya
Lopatino, Bogorodsky District, Nizhny Novgorod Oblast, a settlement in Kamensky Selsoviet of Bogorodsky District
Lopatino, Krasnobakovsky District, Nizhny Novgorod Oblast, a village in Prudovsky Selsoviet of Krasnobakovsky District
Lopatino, Lukoyanovsky District, Nizhny Novgorod Oblast, a selo in Lopatinsky Selsoviet of Lukoyanovsky District
Lopatino, Sergachsky District, Nizhny Novgorod Oblast, a selo in Lopatinsky Selsoviet of Sergachsky District
Lopatino, Tonshayevsky District, Nizhny Novgorod Oblast, a village under the administrative jurisdiction of the work settlement of Tonshayevo in Tonshayevsky District
Lopatino, Vadsky District, Nizhny Novgorod Oblast, a selo in Lopatinsky Selsoviet of Vadsky District
Lopatino, Varnavinsky District, Nizhny Novgorod Oblast, a village in Bogorodsky Selsoviet of Varnavinsky District

Novgorod Oblast
As of 2010, two rural localities in Novgorod Oblast bear this name:
Lopatino, Khvoyninsky District, Novgorod Oblast, a village in Pesskoye Settlement of Khvoyninsky District
Lopatino, Moshenskoy District, Novgorod Oblast, a village in Kirovskoye Settlement of Moshenskoy District

Novosibirsk Oblast
As of 2010, one rural locality in Novosibirsk Oblast bears this name:
Lopatino, Novosibirsk Oblast, a selo in Tatarsky District

Penza Oblast
As of 2010, five rural localities in Penza Oblast bear this name:
Lopatino, Belinsky District, Penza Oblast, a village in Kozlovsky Selsoviet of Belinsky District
Lopatino, Gorodishchensky District, Penza Oblast, a selo in Nizhneyelyuzansky Selsoviet of Gorodishchensky District
Lopatino, Lopatinsky District, Penza Oblast, a selo in Lopatinsky Selsoviet of Lopatinsky District
Lopatino, Mokshansky District, Penza Oblast, a selo in Tsarevshchinsky Selsoviet of Mokshansky District
Lopatino, Vadinsky District, Penza Oblast, a village in Bolshelukinsky Selsoviet of Vadinsky District

Pskov Oblast
As of 2010, eight rural localities in Pskov Oblast bear this name:
Lopatino, Bezhanitsky District, Pskov Oblast, a village in Bezhanitsky District
Lopatino, Novorzhevsky District, Pskov Oblast, a village in Novorzhevsky District
Lopatino, Palkinsky District, Pskov Oblast, a village in Palkinsky District
Lopatino, Pskovsky District, Pskov Oblast, a village in Pskovsky District
Lopatino, Pushkinogorsky District, Pskov Oblast, a village in Pushkinogorsky District
Lopatino, Pustoshkinsky District, Pskov Oblast, a village in Pustoshkinsky District
Lopatino (Sebezhskoye Rural Settlement), Sebezhsky District, Pskov Oblast, a village in Sebezhsky District; municipally, a part of Sebezhskoye Rural Settlement of that district
Lopatino (Boyarinovskaya Rural Settlement), Sebezhsky District, Pskov Oblast, a village in Sebezhsky District; municipally, a part of Boyarinovskaya Rural Settlement of that district

Ryazan Oblast
As of 2010, one rural locality in Ryazan Oblast bears this name:
Lopatino, Ryazan Oblast, a selo in Lopatinsky Rural Okrug of Skopinsky District

Sakhalin Oblast
As of 2010, two rural localities in Sakhalin Oblast bear this name:
Lopatino, Nevelsky District, Sakhalin Oblast, a selo in Nevelsky District
Lopatino, Tomarinsky District, Sakhalin Oblast, a selo in Tomarinsky District

Samara Oblast
As of 2010, three rural localities in Samara Oblast bear this name:
Lopatino, Krasnoyarsky District, Samara Oblast, a selo in Krasnoyarsky District
Lopatino, Stavropolsky District, Samara Oblast, a selo in Stavropolsky District
Lopatino, Volzhsky District, Samara Oblast, a selo in Volzhsky District

Saratov Oblast
As of 2010, two rural localities in Saratov Oblast bear this name:
Lopatino, Balashovsky District, Saratov Oblast, a selo in Balashovsky District
Lopatino, Rtishchevsky District, Saratov Oblast, a selo in Rtishchevsky District

Smolensk Oblast
As of 2010, one rural locality in Smolensk Oblast bears this name:
Lopatino, Smolensk Oblast, a village in Bobrovichskoye Rural Settlement of Yelninsky District

Tambov Oblast
As of 2010, one rural locality in Tambov Oblast bears this name:
Lopatino, Tambov Oblast, a selo under the administrative jurisdiction of Inzhavinsky Settlement Council of Inzhavinsky District

Tula Oblast
As of 2010, one rural locality in Tula Oblast bears this name:
Lopatino, Tula Oblast, a village in Rassvetovsky Rural Okrug of Venyovsky District

Tver Oblast
As of 2010, five rural localities in Tver Oblast bear this name:
Lopatino, Bologovsky District, Tver Oblast, a village in Kuzhenkinskoye Rural Settlement of Bologovsky District
Lopatino, Kuvshinovsky District, Tver Oblast, a village in Pryamukhinskoye Rural Settlement of Kuvshinovsky District
Lopatino, Penovsky District, Tver Oblast, a village in Zayevskoye Rural Settlement of Penovsky District
Lopatino, Staritsky District, Tver Oblast, a village in Pankovo Rural Settlement of Staritsky District
Lopatino, Torzhoksky District, Tver Oblast, a village in Tredubskoye Rural Settlement of Torzhoksky District

Vologda Oblast
As of 2010, one rural locality in Vologda Oblast bears this name:
Lopatino, Vologda Oblast, a village in Kosmarevsky Selsoviet of Nyuksensky District

Yaroslavl Oblast
As of 2010, three rural localities in Yaroslavl Oblast bear this name:
Lopatino, Breytovsky District, Yaroslavl Oblast, a village in Breytovsky Rural Okrug of Breytovsky District
Lopatino, Nekouzsky District, Yaroslavl Oblast, a village in Stanilovsky Rural Okrug of Nekouzsky District
Lopatino, Uglichsky District, Yaroslavl Oblast, a village in Nikolsky Rural Okrug of Uglichsky District